Nogometni klub Neretva Metković, commonly referred to as NK Neretva or simply Neretva, is a Croatian professional football club based in the town of Metković, in the region of Dubrovnik-Neretva County. The club's first name was NK Narona. It was renamed to Neretva in 1994. Neretva reached the Croatian first league in the 1994–95 season.

The club supporters are called Blue White Killers (BWK). NK Neretva plays their home matches at the stadium Igralište iza Vage, which has capacity of 3.000. 
They were briefly dissolved in 2017 for financial reasons. However, in July that year, a new club was formed under the same name.

Derby
Neretva contest the "El Clasico" with NK Neretvanac Opuzen.

Women's team
As of 2017, Neretva field a women's team in the top flight of Croatian football, ŽNK Neretva. They finished 5th in the 2. HNL in 2016.

Recent seasons

Honours

Domestic

League
Croatian Second League:
Winners (1): 1993–94

References

 
Football clubs in Croatia
Football clubs in Dubrovnik-Neretva County
Sport in Metković
Association football clubs established in 1919
1919 establishments in Croatia